{{DISPLAYTITLE:Janko group J2}}

In the area of modern algebra known as group theory, the Janko group J2 or the Hall-Janko group HJ  is a sporadic simple group of order
   2733527 = 604800
 ≈ 6.

History and properties
J2 is one of the 26 Sporadic groups and is also called Hall–Janko–Wales group. In 1969 Zvonimir Janko predicted J2 as one of two new simple groups having 21+4:A5 as a centralizer of an involution (the other is the Janko group J3).

Both the Schur multiplier and the outer automorphism group have order 2. As a permutation group on 100 points J2 has involutions moving all 100 points and involutions moving just 80 points. The former involutions are 
products of 25 double transportions, an odd number, and hence lift to 4-elements in the double cover 2.A100. The double cover 2.J2 occurs as a subgroup of the Conway group Co0.

J2 is the only one of the 4 Janko groups that is a subquotient of the monster group; it is thus part of what Robert Griess calls the Happy Family. Since it is also found in the Conway group Co1, it is therefore part of the second generation of the Happy Family.

Representations 

It is a subgroup of index two of the group of automorphisms of the Hall–Janko graph, leading to a permutation representation of degree 100. It is also a subgroup of index two of the group of automorphisms of the Hall–Janko Near Octagon, leading to a permutation representation of degree 315.

It has a modular representation of dimension six over the field of four elements; if in characteristic two we have , then J2 is generated by the two matrices

and

These matrices satisfy the equations

(Note that matrix multiplication on a finite field of order 4 is defined slightly differently from ordinary matrix multiplication. See  for the specific addition and multiplication tables, with w the same as a and w the same as 1 + a.)

J2 is thus a Hurwitz group, a finite homomorphic image of the (2,3,7) triangle group.

The matrix representation given above constitutes an embedding into Dickson's group G2(4). There is only one conjugacy class of J2 in G2(4). Every subgroup J2 contained in G2(4) extends to a subgroup J2:2= Aut(J2) in G2(4):2= Aut(G2(4)) (G2(4) extended by the field automorphisms of F4). G2(4) is in turn isomorphic to a subgroup of the Conway group Co1.

Maximal subgroups
There are 9 conjugacy classes of maximal subgroups of J2. Some are here described in terms of action on the Hall–Janko graph.

 U3(3) order 6048 – one-point stabilizer, with orbits of 36 and 63
Simple, containing 36 simple subgroups of order 168 and 63 involutions, all conjugate, each moving 80 points. A given involution is found in 12 168-subgroups, thus fixes them under conjugacy. Its centralizer has structure 4.S4, which contains 6 additional involutions.
 3.PGL(2,9) order 2160 – has a subquotient A6
 21+4:A5 order 1920 – centralizer of involution moving 80 points
 22+4:(3 × S3) order 1152
 A4 × A5 order 720
Containing 22 × A5 (order 240), centralizer of 3 involutions each moving 100 points
 A5 × D10 order 600
 PGL(2,7) order 336
 52:D12 order 300
 A5 order 60

Conjugacy classes

The maximum order of any element is 15. As permutations, elements act on the 100 vertices of the Hall–Janko graph.

References 

 Robert L. Griess, Jr., "Twelve Sporadic Groups", Springer-Verlag, 1998.
 (Griess relates [p. 123] how Marshall Hall, as editor of The Journal of Algebra, received a very short paper entitled "A simple group of order 604801." Yes, 604801 is prime.)

 Wales, David B., "The uniqueness of the simple group of order 604800 as a subgroup of SL(6,4)", Journal of Algebra 11 (1969), 455–460.
 Wales, David B., "Generators of the Hall–Janko group as a subgroup of G2(4)", Journal of Algebra 13 (1969), 513–516,

External links
 MathWorld: Janko Groups
 Atlas of Finite Group Representations: J2
 The subgroup lattice of J2

Sporadic groups